The Shops on Steeles and 404 is a small 70-store community mall at the corner of Steeles Avenue East and Don Mills Road in Markham, Ontario. Aside from a few chains, the mall is mostly independent stores.

History
Sears Canada used to be a major anchor, originally as a full line Sears, then as a Sears Home (selling furniture and appliances) and in recent years as a Sears Outlet, but closed in April 2017. Bobby's Liquidation Outlet occupied the space vacated by Sears. A liquidation outlet called Closeout King was located within the anchor building but was removed after five months of non-payment. In January 2019 Bobby's Outlet closed (moved to Promenade Mall in Vaughan) with mall owners planning to re-develop the space.

In 2007, the mall was slated for residential re-development called Markhamgate Summit, with some retail stores at ground level, as well as a new transit hub for the Toronto Transit Commission and York Region Transit. Although the land is in Markham, Ontario (in the community of Thornhill, Ontario), Toronto city councillor David Shiner invoked the 1974 Agreement, which grants Toronto limited planning authority over York Region land that is within 45 metres of Steeles Avenue, which Toronto owns, to veto the developer plans of several condominium towers. Shiner argued that the proposed number of residential units was too high which would create too much traffic in the neighborhood, while Markham councillor Howard Ian Shore and the developer countered that the project would not be viable if the number of residential units was lowered below the agreed-upon figure. As of 2018, the project has not proceeded and the original mall remains standing and operating.

See also
List of largest enclosed shopping malls in Canada
List of shopping malls in Canada

References

Shopping malls in the Regional Municipality of York
Buildings and structures in Markham, Ontario
Tourist attractions in Markham, Ontario